Ventnor is a small town on Phillip Island in Victoria, Australia. It is the location of the Phillip Island Grand Prix Circuit.

It was named after the town of Ventnor on the Isle of Wight.

Quite a number of the roads in Ventnor, Phillip Island are named after other towns and villages on the Isle of Wight.

Demographics
The median age of persons in Ventnor was 58 years. There were less males than females, with 49.6% of the population male and 50.4% female. The average household size was 2.2 people per household.

Notes and references

Phillip Island
Towns in Victoria (Australia)
Bass Coast Shire